Coccosteomorphi is an extinct clade of arthrodire placoderms within the Eubrachythoraci (of the suborder Brachythoraci), armored fish most diverse during the Devonian. Most are considered to be pelagic (open ocean) long-distance swimmers, leading to their widespread distribution beginning from at least the Middle Devonian period.

Phylogeny
Coccosteomorphi is the sister taxon to Pachyosteomorphi, which together are the two main sub-clades of Eubrachythoraci. Coccosteomorphi can be further sub-divided into Coccosteoidea and Incisoscutoidea, as shown in the cladogram below:

References

Arthrodires